Cyprinella is a genus of fish in the family Cyprinidae, the carps and minnows. They are known as the satinfin shiners. They are native to North America, and some are among the most common freshwater fish species on the eastern side of the continent. Conversely, several Cyprinella species with small distributions are threatened and the Maravillas Creek subspecies of the red shiner (Cyprinella lutrensis blairi) is extinct.

Breeding males often develop bright coloration. Fish of the genus produce audible sounds during courtship and conflict.

Species
There are currently 32 recognized species in this genus:

Cyprinella alvarezdelvillari Contreras-Balderas & Lozano-Vilano, 1994 (Tepehuan shiner)
Cyprinella analostana Girard, 1859 (satinfin shiner)
Cyprinella bocagrande (Chernoff & R. R. Miller, 1982) (largemouth shiner)
Cyprinella caerulea (D. S. Jordan, 1877) (Blue shiner)
Cyprinella callisema (D. S. Jordan, 1877) (Ocmulgee shiner)
Cyprinella callistia (D. S. Jordan, 1877) (Alabama shiner)
Cyprinella callitaenia (R. M. Bailey & Gibbs, 1956) (bluestripe shiner)
Cyprinella camura (D. S. Jordan & Meek, 1884) (bluntface shiner)
Cyprinella chloristia (D. S. Jordan and Brayton, 1878) (greenfin shiner)
Cyprinella eurystoma (D. S. Jordan, 1877)
Cyprinella formosa (Girard, 1856) (beautiful shiner)
Cyprinella galactura (Cope, 1868) (whitetail shiner)
Cyprinella garmani (D. S. Jordan, 1885) (gibbous shiner)
Cyprinella gibbsi (W. M. Howell & J. D. Williams, 1971) (Tallapoosa shiner)
Cyprinella labrosa (Cope, 1870) (thicklip chub)
Cyprinella leedsi (Fowler, 1942) (bannerfin shiner)
Cyprinella lepida Girard, 1856 (plateau shiner)
Cyprinella lutrensis (S. F. Baird & Girard, 1853) (red shiner)
Cyprinella monacha (Cope, 1868) (spotfin chub)
Cyprinella nivea (Cope, 1870) (whitefin shiner)
Cyprinella panarcys (C. L. Hubbs & R. R. Miller, 1978) (Conchos shiner)
Cyprinella proserpina (Girard, 1856) (Proserpine shiner)
Cyprinella pyrrhomelas (Cope, 1870) (fieryblack shiner)
Cyprinella rutila (Girard, 1856) (Mexican red shiner)
Cyprinella spiloptera (Cope, 1867) (spotfin shiner)
Cyprinella stigmatura (D. S. Jordan, 1877)
Cyprinella trichroistia (D. S. Jordan & C. H. Gilbert, 1878) (tricolor shiner)
Cyprinella venusta Girard, 1856 (blacktail shiner)
Cyprinella whipplei Girard, 1856 (steelcolor shiner)
Cyprinella xaenura (D. S. Jordan, 1877) (Altamaha shiner)
Cyprinella xanthicara (W. L. Minckley & Lytle, 1969) (Cuatro Cienegas shiner)
Cyprinella zanema (D. S. Jordan and Brayton, 1878) (Santee chub)

References 

 
Cyprinidae genera
Cyprinid fish of North America
Freshwater fish of the United States
Taxonomy articles created by Polbot